Sir Guy Elwin Millard  (22 January 1917 – 26 April 2013) was a British diplomat who was closely involved in the Suez crisis, and afterwards ambassador to Hungary, Sweden and Italy.

Career
Guy Elwin Millard was educated at Wixenford, Charterhouse, and Pembroke College, Cambridge. He entered the Diplomatic Service in 1939, but served in the Royal Navy during the Second World War.

Millard was a junior secretary to Anthony Eden during the war, and when Eden became Prime Minister in 1955 he arranged for Millard to be seconded from the Foreign Office to be his Private Secretary for Foreign Affairs. He was thus closely involved with the Suez Crisis in 1956. Afterwards he wrote a detailed history of the episode, an edited version of which remains in the National Archives.

Millard was Ambassador to Hungary 1967–69, Minister in Washington, D.C., 1970–71, Ambassador to Sweden 1971–74 and Ambassador to Italy 1974–76. After retiring from the Diplomatic Service, he served as chairman of the British-Italian Society 1977–83.

Millard was appointed CMG in the 1957 New Year Honours and CVO in 1961 on the occasion of a state visit by Queen Elizabeth II to Iran, where Millard was stationed at the time. He was knighted KCMG in the New Year Honours of 1972. The Italian government made him a Grand Officer of the Order of Merit in 1981.

References

External links

1917 births
2013 deaths
People educated at Charterhouse School
People educated at Wixenford School
Alumni of Pembroke College, Cambridge
Royal Navy personnel of World War II
Ambassadors of the United Kingdom to Hungary
Ambassadors of the United Kingdom to Sweden
Ambassadors of the United Kingdom to Italy
Knights Commander of the Order of St Michael and St George
Commanders of the Royal Victorian Order
Grand Officers of the Order of Merit of the Italian Republic